The Battle of Khai Phat-Na Ngan (or Phai Khat-Na Ngan) was the first battle ever fought by the People's Army of Vietnam. Taking place in December 1944, it involved a series of raids by the Viet Minh Armed Propaganda Unit (Tran Hung Dao platoon) on French outposts at Khai Phat and Na Ngan. Personally led by Vo Nguyen Giap, the force consisted of 31 men and 3 women armed with two revolvers, seventeen rifles, one light machine gun, and fourteen breech-loading flintlocks dating from the Russo-Japanese War. The first raid was on Khai Phat outpost, in which the commander was killed and its armoury seized, making the colonial troops surrender without a fight. The second took place the following day at Na Ngan where another officer was killed. These raids gave the Viet Minh its first victory, and defectors from the garrisons bolstered their ranks.

Background 
In 1940, Japan had invaded French Indochina and occupied it. During the period of occupation, the Viet Minh expanded their size, and in September 1944 the first Revolutionary Party Military Conference was held. During the conference, it was agreed that it was time to take the military struggle forward into a new phase. Subsequently, the formation of the Vietnam Liberation Army was proclaimed, with Giáp as its commander. Ho Chi Minh directed him to establish Armed Propaganda Brigades and the first one, consisting of thirty-one men and three women, was formed in December 1944 and named the Tran Hung Dao Platoon.

Battle 
In late December, two outposts in Cao Bang province were selected. Using a 12 year old named Hoang as a spy, the Viet Minh discovered that they were mainly guarded by colonial soldiers. At 5 pm on December 25, Viet Minh troops dressed in French uniforms entered Khai Phat and seized its armoury, wounding the guard and killing the French commander in the process, making the unarmed garrison promptly surrender. This was repeated the following day at Na Ngan, with the commander also being killed and the garrison surrendering after a short fight.

Aftermath 
The Viet Minh seized 40 rifles, 2 sidearms and 3000 piastres during these raids. They also captured 37 prisoners (including a French NCO), most of whom either defected or were released to go home. The minor victory gave the Viet Minh its first experience in combat and was the first of many battles against the French.

References 

1944 in Vietnam
1944 in military history
Viet Minh
Võ Nguyên Giáp